Leon v. United States may refer to:
 Leon v. United States (1966)
 United States v. Leon (1984)